Convoy SC 20 was the 20th of the numbered series of World War II Slow Convoys of merchant ships from Sydney, Cape Breton Island to Liverpool. The trade convoy left Halifax on 22 January 1941 and was found by U-boats of the 2nd and 9th Flotillas, operating from Lorient and Brest, respectively. Five ships were sunk before the convoy reached Liverpool on 8 February.

Ships in the convoy

References

Bibliography

External links
SC.20 at convoyweb

SC020
Naval battles of World War II involving Canada